Slovenian Freestyle Battle Championship, commonly called just National Championship in Freestyle Battle ("Državno prvenstvo v freestyle Battlu), is a competition in Slovenia bringing rappers from all over the country to compete in freestyle battles. There is also an additional version of such competition that runs concurrently and has a longer history, but instead of using classical insulting battles, rappers are tested with various topics, given words, hidden objects and character plays that must all be inserted in their rapping.

List of classic freestyle battle Champions
 2009: N'toko
 2013: Amo

List of topical freestyle Champions
 2001: N'toko
 2003: N'toko and Trkaj (2 winners)
 2005: Unknown
 2008: Pižama
 2011: Unknown
 2015: Unknown

See also
 Slovenian hip hop
 Freestyle rap

References

Slovenian hip hop
Rapping
Entertainment events in Slovenia